Mike Landers may refer to:
 Mike Landers (politician)
 Mike Landers (American football)